Elections were held on November 7, 1933 to fill the 65 seats of the New York City Board of Aldermen. Having been hitherto relegated to one seat held by Joseph Clarke of the 3rd district, Republicans were able to win 17 seats.

References

New York City Council elections
1933 New York (state) elections

1933 United States local elections